Harry Stebbings is a British venture capitalist, that started "The Twenty Minute VC" podcast and in 2020 launched his own venture capital fund.

Career 
Stebbings started The Twenty Minute VC podcast with $50 and not a single contact in the venture capital industry. The first episode was an interview with Guy Kawasaki, released on 10 January 2015.

In May 2017, Stebbings left his job at venture capital firm Atomico after six months working there.

In 2019, Stebbings was included on the Forbes 30 Under 30 in Europe list, in the finance category.

Stebbings launched his venture capital fund, 20VC fund, in May 2020. In June 2021, Stebbings raised a further  in funding. The fund focuses on investments in Europe and North America. Harry's largest investment to date is Tripledot Studios, one of the fastest growing companies in Europe. Other notable investments include Pachama, Nex Health, Sorare, BeReal, Linktree, Taxdoo, Athenian and Merge.

References 

British venture capitalists
British podcasters
Living people
Year of birth missing (living people)
Date of birth missing (living people)
Place of birth missing (living people)